Joanne Marie Anderson (born 7 January 1971) is a British Labour Party politician who has served as the second Mayor of Liverpool since May 2021. She previously served as the Liverpool City Councillor for the Princes Park ward from October 2019 to May 2021. She is the first woman to be Mayor of the city and the first black woman to be a directly elected mayor in the UK. 

Anderson is due to leave office in May 2023, in line with the abolition of the post of directly-elected mayor of Liverpool.

Early life
Anderson was born in Liverpool in 1971. She has said that growing up under Margaret Thatcher's government made her feel like she was "at the bottom of the pile" and that she would not "amount to much". 

Anderson left school at 16 with no qualifications, but completed a degree in Business Studies as a mature adult. She completed a BA in business studies at Liverpool John Moores University between 1996 and 1999, and is currently completing an MBA at the same university.

Anderson has had a successful career as an equality, diversity and inclusion practitioner and a business consultant.

Career
Anderson's profession is mainly as a freelance business consultant, but she has also worked as a civil servant for the Crown Prosecution Service for over a decade. She previously worked as a community consultant and has worked as an advisor and a member of the board of trustees for various organisations, including Emmaus Merseyside (a charity providing work and housing to homeless people in the UK), Merseyside Probation Service, and Merseyside Equality and Employment Law. She was elected as a councillor for the Princes Park ward in a by-election in October 2019 with 73% of the vote, and has served on the Education and Children's Services Select Committee.

Mayor of Liverpool

Anderson became Labour's candidate for Mayor of Liverpool following the announcement by incumbent Mayor Joe Anderson (no relation) that he would not run for re-election following his arrest in December 2020. She became the party's candidate after the selection process re-opened and the three initial candidates (Acting Mayor Wendy Simon, Lord Mayor Anna Rothery, and former Deputy Mayor Ann O'Byrne) were barred from running. She was elected Mayor of Liverpool with 59.2% of the vote in a second round of voting, since she failed to secure 50% of the votes in the first round. She is the first black woman to be a directly elected Mayor in the UK. She has vowed to campaign to end violence against women and girls and implement the recommendations of the Caller Report, which highlighted "serious failings" in the city council's leadership.

AOC Arms Fair

A controversial arms fair event was held at Liverpool's Exhibition Centre despite widescale protests and objections. The venue is part of the Arena and Convention Centre in Liverpool, which is owned by Liverpool City Council but run by a separate company.

Mayor Joanne Anderson, along with a number of members of her top team, has publicly stated that she fundamentally disagrees with the holding of the arms fair, an event that was booked way before her time in office. Joanne stated that the council is powerless in stopping the event from take place, and trying to do so would leave the authority open to legal challenges.

In a statement, Mayor Anderson said: "AOC Europe 2021 raises serious moral and ethical questions. I am appalled that this event is being held in Liverpool – in one of our buildings. Many of you have been in touch with me to outline, in no uncertain terms, your views. I am a pacifist and I have been consistently clear that I am in absolute agreement with you. I have sought extensive soundings from our legal team, but based on their expert advice, regrettably there is nothing that I as Mayor, or the council, can do to prevent this event from taking place. What I won’t do, is subject our council to legal challenge at a time when our resources are so limited."

Mayor Joanne Anderson has called on ACC Liverpool to implement a motion passed by Full Council in July, requesting that the venues adopts an ethical charter and update their risk register to include risk embarrassment and negative association for Liverpool City Council. This will ensure that future potential events are considered in line with the fundamental values of Liverpool before being accepted.

Personal life
Anderson described herself as a single mother of a teenage boy in 2018, and has said that she has faced bankruptcy several times. She has called herself a "proud black, working-class Scouser who loves our city and its people".

Anderson is a fan of City of Liverpool FC, citing her preference for the team over either of the city's two most famous teams (Liverpool FC and Everton FC) because it is "community owned and operated" and represents unity within the city, in contrast to the rivalry between Liverpool and Everton. Referencing the team's trademark colour, which combines the colours of Liverpool and Everton, she tweeted, "We are a proud footballing city with a rich and historic affiliation to the sport. Mix blue with red, you get purple."

References

Living people
Year of birth uncertain
Liverpool City Council
Alumni of Liverpool John Moores University
Labour Party (UK) councillors
Mayors of Liverpool
Women councillors in England
Women mayors of places in England
Labour Party (UK) mayors
1971 births